Tehkikaat is a Hindi language crime drama series starring Vijay Anand as Sam D'Silva and Saurabh Shukla as Gopichand.

Main Cast

List of episodes

References

External links
 

1994 Indian television series debuts
Indian crime television series
Detective television series
DD National original programming
1995 Indian television series endings